The 2008–09 season was Olympique Lyonnais's 50th anniversary season in 
Ligue 1 and was their 20th consecutive season in the top division of French football. They were the defending champions having won the title the past seven consecutive seasons. They were entering the season after achieving their first ever double after winning the Coupe de France, along with their league title.

News
Following the 2007–08 season, it was announced by Lyon Chairman Jean-Michel Aulas that manager Alain Perrin would not be returning despite being the first Lyon manager to win the double. Lyon management attributed the firing to "Perrin's several malfunctions that affected the squad daily throughout the season" and their constant failure in Europe. Following an extensive search, which linked the Lyon managerial position to several managers, including former Manchester United assistant and current Portugal national football team coach Carlos Queiroz, Brazilian manager Vanderlei Luxemburgo, and former French players and managers Didier Deschamps and Laurent Blanc to name a few, it was announced on 18 June 2008 that Lille manager Claude Puel would succeed Perrin.

During the managerial search, Lyon made several transfers, though even prior to the managerial search, Lyon made a significant transfer deal, signing Brazilian midfielder Ederson from Nice in January for €15 million. The summer transfers included Hugo Lloris (€8.5 million) who was brought in to replace to outgoing Grégory Coupet, Miralem Pjanić (€7.5 million), Jean Makoun (€14 million) and John Mensah (€8.4 million), who was brought in to replace the outgoing Sébastien Squillaci.

Following last year promotions of youth players Sandy Paillot, Anthony Mounier and Romain Beynié from the youth scheme to the professional squad, Lyon signed another set of youth players to professional contracts. Midfielders Pierrick Valdivia (no relation to Chilean playmaker Jorge Valdivia), Clément Grenier and Saïd Mehamha, and striker Yannis Tafer were promoted to the first-team squad, although they will still play on Lyon's second squad in the CFA. Lyon also sign young prospect Timothée Kolodziejczak from Lens. Kolodziejcak, a teammate of Tafer and Grenier on the international stage, will initially move to Lyon on a loan with a purchase clause likely to occur at a later date. Also in an effort to increase their youths' playing time, Lyon re-loaned Sandy Paillot to Grenoble for the entirety of the season and loaned out midfielder Romain Beynié to Belgian side Tubize.

Notable departures included Loïc Rémy, who moved to Nice and French wunderkind Hatem Ben Arfa, who moved to rivals Marseille. The Ben Arfa move was put into speculation after Lyon officials argued that an agreement was not made between the two clubs. However, after a meeting between the two clubs organized by the LFP, the transfer was back on. Morevor, aforementioned central defender Sébastien Squillaci moved to Sevilla of La Liga.

Other departures include Grégory Coupet, who moved to Atlético Madrid after spending 12 years with the club, Patrick Müller and Frédéric Roux, whose contracts expired on 30 June 2008, and Marc Crosas, who returned to Barcelona after spending the winter on loan with Lyon. Inconsistent striker Milan Baroš additionally moved to Turkish side Galatasaray.

This summer also saw the departure of several Lyon youth players who will attempt to ply their trade elsewhere. Lossémy Karaboué, Alexandre Bouchard, and Aurélien Badin have moved to Ligue 2 sides Sedan, Châteauroux and Troyes respectively. The Italian Francesco Migliore moved to Belgian side R.A.E.C. Mons. Young striker Stephen Ettien moved to Scottish side Hamilton Academical, while Mohamed Bedda and Mickael Charvet earned trials at Strasbourg and Nice respectively.

Transfers

Summer 2008 In 

Total spending:  €57.9 million

Summer 2008 out

Total income:  €33.5 million

Winter 2009 out

Squad information
Last updated May 30, 2009

Club

Coaching staff

Other information

Team kits
Umbro will provide the kits for Olympique Lyonnais. Umbro have been the official kit provider of Lyon since 2003 and just last year signed an extension with Lyon until 2013. This season, Lyon will have brand new home, away, and Champions League kits. The kits were presented on June 30, 2008. The new home kit is original white with the red and blue vertical strip, along with single blue stripes along the shoulders. The new away kit is all blue with single black stripes along the shoulders and the new Champions League away kit is electric yellow with the red and blue vertical stripe, along with single red and blue stripes on the shoulders. The team's alternate away kit consists of the home shirt with red shorts and white socks. It is only worn when Lyon are unable to wear their white shorts in an away tie due to the designated home team wearing white shorts.

|
|
|
|
|
|
|}

Pre-season friendlies
Lyon played a total of six friendly matches. Lyon opened up their pre-season on 12 July with a 3–2 victory over Nîmes in Albertville, near Tignes, the location of Lyon's pre-season camp. A week later, on 19 July, they traveled away to Bucharest to face Rapid București, which resulted in a 2–1 loss. They then took a trip to Belgrade to play against Partizan on 23 July. Lyon came out with a positive result, beating the Serbian side 3–1 with goals from Karim Benzema and Sidney Govou. They followed that victory up with another as they cruised to a 3–0 victory over Ligue 1 side Nancy in nearby Villefranche-sur-Saône. Their last friendly in the month of July would in turn be a 0–1 defeat to AS Monaco on July 29 in Annecy. Their final friendly match was the annual Trophée des Champions match. Since Lyon won both the league and the Coupe de France, they faced the club that finished in second place in Ligue 1 this past season, Bordeaux. The match was played on 2 August at Bordeaux's ground, the Stade Chaban-Delmas. After 90 minutes without a goal, Bordeaux defeated Lyon 5–4 on penalties to earn their first Trophée des Champions title, ending Lyon's streak of six-straight Trophée des Champions titles.

Competitions
Lyon opened up their Ligue 1 season in a positive fashion, defeating Toulouse 3–0 with a brace from Karim Benzema and a rare goal from Jean Makoun. Following a 0–0 draw away to Lorient, which dropped them to third in the league standings, Lyon rebounded with back-to-back wins over Rhône-Alpes rivals Grenoble and Saint-Étienne respectively. Following that, Lyon picked up their third-straight victory with a 3–2 win over Nice. The match was, however, marred with controversy—after trailing 0–2, Lyon got back into the match with two spectacular free-kicks from Juninho. With the match in injury time and looking to end in a draw, referee Jean-Charles Cailleux and one of his assistant referees ruled a handball infraction had been committed by Nice defender Vincent Hognon in the box, giving Lyon a penalty which was converted by Benzema. Looking at the replay, it could have easily been determined that the handball infraction had been without malice and that the penalty should have not been given. However, Lyon escaped with a victory, which moved them into first place. They followed this win up with back to back one goal wins over newly promoted side Le Havre and Nancy giving them five-straight league victories.

The following week, Lyon received their first loss in the league against Rennes that would later be described as a "thrashing" by the media. Lyon struggled in every aspect of the match and allowed Rennes striker Mickaël Pagis to score a hat-trick, the last goal being a beautiful strike from almost 30 yards out. The loss to Rennes showed as Lyon's horrible form continued drawing with both Lille and Auxerre the following two weeks. Lyon finally got back on track with shut-out wins over Sochaux, Le Mans and Monaco before heading into their showdown with imminent rivals Bordeaux. With Lyon playing at home, they proved to still be the most dominant French side in the league, defeating Bordeaux 2–1 with goals from Benzema and a beautiful goal from Kim Källström. The following week, Lyon got another test, this time in Paris. In this match, Lyon not only incurred their second defeat, but they lost their consistent right back Anthony Réveillère to injury with the player likely being out for the season, though he later returned to the squad. The following match, Lyon only managed a 0–0 draw in the downpouring rain against Valenciennes.

Lyon suffered their third defeat of the season the following week against relegation strugglers Nantes. Lyon came into the match apparently looking ahead to their Champions League clash with Bayern Munich and proceeded to underestimate the West Coast side, who defeated Lyon 1–2 with two goals from the Croat Ivan Klasnić. The loss was promptly followed by a showdown for first place with rivals Marseille the following week. Other than battling for first place, the return of Hatem Ben Arfa to the Stade Gerland was on the minds of supporters, as well as the players. However, despite the hype and build-up leading up to the match, including achieving a record television audience, both clubs failed to score a goal as the match ended in another 0–0 draw. Lyon finally ended their winless run with a 1–0 victory over Caen with Benzema scoring Lyon's lone goal, his tenth of the league campaign. With the victory, Lyon were assured first place heading into the three-week winter break.

Lyon returned from the winter break taking on Lorient. Despite getting an early goal from Ederson, Lyon failed to get a winning result leaving the match with a 1–1 draw. The following week, they rebounded with a 2–0 victory over Grenoble with Ederson getting on the scoreboard for the second-straight week. Due to Lyon's cup matches being postponed, they were forced to endure two cup matches in a span of four days before facing rivals Saint-Étienne. The match ended in another 1–1 draw. After a full week of training, Lyon again rebounded from a draw picking up a convincing 3–1 victory over Hugo Lloris' former club Nice, with Jean Makoun scoring an unexpected brace. This match also marked the league debut of youth product Yannis Tafer. The following week, they picked up another convincing 3–1 win, this time against Le Havre, with Makoun scoring again. This match also marked Lyon's third-straight match where a red card was given. The following week, Lyon again earned a victory, defeating Nancy 2–0. Lyon started the match without the majority of their regulars who were being rested for the first leg of their Champion's League showdown with Barcelona.

Returning from Champion's League play, Lyon faced Rennes, who was responsible for the champions first loss of the season. The match remained even until the 66th minute when Kim Källström scored following a gifted pass from the youngster Miralem Pjanić. The scoreline remained until injury time when Rennes striker Jimmy Briand scored after receiving a nice through-ball which caught Lyon defender Cris off guard. Briand proceeded to get a shot on the ball off balance, which got past the charging Hugo Lloris to tie the match 1–1, the eventual final scoreline. Lyon followed this draw with a defeat taking on Lille, whom they had just contested three days ago in a Coupe de France tie. With the match being played at the Stade de France and the clubs entertaining a record crowd, Lyon fielded a pretty strong, yet questionable side with players Mathieu Bodmer and François Clerc returning from a long absence and also having the task of defeating Barcelona in Spain in the second leg of their Champion's League clash. In the match, Lyon failed constantly to get on the scoreboard with the former mastiff Kader Keïta missing on numerous opportunities. Lille made sure they made good on their chances with Róbert Vittek scoring the opening goal in the 60th minute and Michel Bastos finishing off Lyon, scoring the second goal in the 88th minute to pick up a 0–2 victory.

After returning from their embarrassing defeat to Barcelona in Spain, Lyon suffered another embarrassment losing their first match at home this season to minnows Auxerre, despite both management and Claude Puel stating the club would respond positively to their elimination from the Champion's League. Fielding exactly the same lineup that lost 2–5 to Barcelona, Lyon failed for the second week in a row to get on the scoreboard losing 0–2 to Auxerre, who got goals from Ireneusz Jeleń and Thomas Kahlenberg, leaving Lyon to hope they get a positive result from the Le Classique in order to hold on to their first-place position.

They would indeed keep hold of first place as a result of Marseille's 3–1 victory over PSG. Lyon responded by picking up their first league victory in over three matches in a 2–0 win over Sochaux. They captured their second-straight league victory in a win over Le Mans with Karim Benzema securing a much-needed brace in a 3–1 win. With the likes of Marseille, Bordeaux, PSG, Lille and Toulouse on their backs, Lyon needed victories to ensure their eighth-straight league title. They proceeded to falter drawing with mid-table club Monaco 2–2. Despite being ten spots down in the table, Monaco were the stronger side forcing Lyon to come back from a goal down twice. The draw also dropped Lyon from the top spot, which they had held since the fourth week of the season. With Marseille recording a victory over Lorient hours before, Lyon needed a victory over Bordeaux to ensure they remain in the title race. Early on in the match, Lyon were denied a clear penalty chance after Ederson was taking down in the box by Bordeaux right back Matthieu Chalmé. Bordeaux proceeded to score just before half-time with a goal from the former Lyonnais Alou Diarra after Wendel hit the post on a shot off a corner kick. Chalmé would be involved in another denied penalty dispute later in the match, this time with Benzema. Despite the initial foul occurring inside the penalty box, referee Stéphane Bré ruled the foul had occurred outside the box where Benzema fell. Eventually, Lyon fell to Bordeaux dropping the defending champions to third and, instead of fighting for the title, were now fighting for the third and final Champions League place with PSG, whom they faced next week. Played on a Friday, Lyon failed to score a goal for the second straight week as the match ended in a 0–0 draw. The next week against Valenciennes, Lyon endured their seventh defeat of the season, losing 0–2. The lost effectively, but not mathematically, eliminated Lyon from winning their eight consecutive title. That occurred the following week. Despite defeating Nantes 3–0 with Jean Makoun scoring a brace, a victory by Bordeaux over Valenciennes eliminated Lyon from title contention. 

Instead of reminiscing, Lyon took the opportunity to focus on qualifying for next year's UEFA Champions League with a key match against Marseille. Though they were positioned for the third qualifying round in the standings, Lyon looked to jump Marseille into second position to go directly through the group stage. In front of a record crowd for a Marseille match, Lyon cruised to a 3–1 victory, with Benzema finally ending his goal drought scoring a brace. Juninho scored the third goal. The following week, against Caen, Juninho and Benzema scored again in a 3–1 victory. For Juninho, it was his 100th career goal for Lyon. Juninho also received a standing ovation upon being substituted out, in what some knew was his final match at the Stade Gerland. Unfortunately, the victory was with malice since Marseille also won that week. Lyon were now guaranteed to finish in the third spot, meaning they would be seeded directly into the Playoff round, where they might end up facing the likes of the 2008–09 UEFA Cup champions Shakhtar Donetsk and Sporting CP.

Ligue 1

League table

Results summary

Results by round

UEFA Champions League
Lyon entered the 2008–09 UEFA Champions League for the eighth-straight season. Due to finishing as champions of Ligue 1 the past season, Lyon again entered directly to the group stage. The draw for the group stage was determined on August 28, 2008. Lyon were paired with the defending German champions Bayern Munich, Italian side Fiorentina and the Romanian runners-up Steaua București.

Lyon began their Champions League quest at home taking on Fiorentina. Lyon also unveiled their fluorescent green third kit in this match. As with the Nice match, which occurred just four days before, this match had its share of controversy. Following a disappointing first half, with Fiorentina leading 0–2 after two goals from Alberto Gilardino, Lyon came out for the second half with scoring in mind. With Lyon attacking, following a cross into the box, a collision occurred just inside the field of play between Frédéric Piquionne and Fiorentina defender Luciano Zauri, which unexpectedly injured the latter. Following a clearance by the Fiorentina defence, it was expected, by Fiorentina, that the ball would be put out of play with fair play being in mind. However, with Lyon trailing 0–2 and several Lyon players not having any idea of Zauri being down, they proceeded to attack and eventually a goal was scored by Piquionne. Following this incident, Lyon still trailed 1–2, but in the 86th minute, after earning a free kick, Juninho and Benzema proceeded to display excellent and sly teamwork as Benzema equalised for his side drawing the match 2–2 and giving both clubs one point through one round.

With one point in hand, Lyon traveled to Munich to take on group leaders Bayern, who defeated Steaua București 1–0 on the opening matchday. With both teams coming off unimpressive matches a couple of days before (Lyon an unspectacular 2–1 victory over Nancy and Bayern, a 0–1 loss away to Hannover 96), the match showed why with Lyon's only goal coming off the head of Bayern defender Martín Demichelis in the 25th minute from one of Juninho's spot-kicks. Bayern later equalised through Zé Roberto in the second half. Though Lyon had decent chances, including one where Karim Benzema had a chance to capitalize on a Bayern mistake late in the second half, the match remained 1–1 with Lyon leaving Munich with just two points through two matches.

After starting off slow, Lyon rebounded picking up two victories in their home-away series with Steaua. Similar to last season matches with VfB Stuttgart, Lyon used these matches to get back into the competition defeating Steaua 5–3 in Romania. They came back from a 2–0 deficit and a 3–2 one-goal deficit before finishing off the Romanian side in the latter portion of the second half with a goal from Benzema and a brace from Fred. The second match was a positive result as well, with Lyon picking up a solid 2–0 victory with goals from Juninho and Anthony Réveillère. With the result in the other match between Bayern and Fiorentina being a draw, this moved Lyon into first place in the group (on goal differential) heading into the final two matchdays.

With the group stage drawing to an end and injuries piling up, Lyon traveled to Florence to again face Fiorentina. Despite having injury troubles at the back of the defense, Lyon performed well and only conceded one goal, again from Alberto Gilardino, though at the time of the goal, Lyon were up 2–0 after goals from Jean Makoun and Karim Benzema. Despite chances from Juninho and Ederson, in which both players hit the post in amazing fashion, the scoreline remained as Lyon booked their place in the knockout stage. In the final group stage match, which decided what team would finish first place in the group, Bayern Munich defeated Lyon 2–3, scoring all three of their goals in the first half. Lyon controlled the second half with two goals from Sidney Govou and Benzema, but could not get a third to draw the match or a fourth to win the group. With this result, Lyon went through as second.

Group F

Results by round

First Knockout Round
For the six-straight season, Lyon reached the first knockout round. Due to finishing second, Lyon faced the danger of being paired with several big clubs that finished first in other groups. Notable clubs Lyon could have been paired with include Liverpool, Manchester United, Barcelona and Juventus to name a few. Following the draw, Lyon indeed received a tough draw, being given La Liga side Barcelona. Lyon and Barcelona were in the same group the previous Champions League season. Lyon lost to Barcelona 0–3 at the Camp Nou, but played well enough to earn a 2–2 draw at home.

In the opening leg at the Gerland, Lyon got off to a quick start scoring in just the seventh minute with a deceiving free kick, from an odd angle, by Juninho, which confused Barcelona goalkeeper Víctor Valdés and eventually with into the inside of the side netting. Lyon continued to perform well into the first half, with the defence constantly pressing Barcelona's attack and Lyon's offence missing on a variety of goal chances. Barcelona eventually got its equaliser from the head of Thierry Henry, drawing the match at 1–1. This was the final scoreline as Lyon headed into the second leg at the Camp Nou.

In the second leg, the exact opposite occurred, with Barcelona constantly pressurizing Lyon in the first half, leaving Barcelona to control the match with most of the possession occurring in Barça's attack. This showed as Barcelona earned first half goals from Henry twice, Lionel Messi and Samuel Eto'o, which effectively ended Lyon's chances of advancing to the quarter-finals, despite Jean Makoun and Juninho scoring back-to-back goals in the 44th and 48th minutes respectively. The final scoreline eventually was 2–5, eliminating Lyon from the Champion's League for the seventh consecutive season and for the third consecutive season in the Round of 16.

Coupe de la Ligue
Lyon entered the Coupe de la Ligue season having last won the cup in 2001. The previous season, they were eliminated in the quarterfinals by Le Mans. As with all other years, Lyon entered the cup in the Round of 16 as they qualified for the UEFA Champions League, where they faced last year's relegated side Metz. However, despite being relegated last season, Metz pulled off a tremendous 1–3 victory eliminating the defending league champions from the competition for the 8th straight season. Since winning the title in 2001, Lyon have only made it to January (usually when the quarter-finals take place) four times.

Coupe de France
Lyon entered the 2008–2009 Coupe de France season as defending champions, having won the title the previous season in a highly contested 1–0 victory against Paris Saint-Germain. Lyon began the defense of their title heading to the West coast to take on the Brittany-based side US Concarneau. The match was postponed from its assigned 3 January date due to a frozen pitch and was rescheduled to be played on January 24, 2009. Though Lyon were the dominant side the entire match, the score at halftime was only 2–0. Lyon came out blazing in the second half scoring four goals, three of them in the final six minutes of the match to defeat Concarneau by a score of 6–0. 

Lyon advanced to the Round of 32 where they faced rivals Marseille in what was the first big draw of the Cup. In the match, Lyon got off to a quick start with Karim Benzema scoring the first goal in just the second minute. The rest of the match was fairly even, though, marred with several incidents, including former Lyon player Hatem Ben Arfa receiving a barrage of boos when he entered as a substitute in the 16th minute, as well as every time he touched the ball and Lyon player Kader Keïta picking up a second yellow card for elbowing new Marseille player Brandão in the face. In the end, Benzema's goal was the only goal of the match with Lyon securing their place in the Round of 16, where they faced another secondary rival, Lille. Lille, whom Lyon were to face in a league tie three days later, opened the scoring with a goal from Michel Bastos in the 22nd minute. Lyon responded just two minutes later with a goal from Jean Makoun. Just before half-time, Lille's prolific youngster Eden Hazard scored to give Lille a 2–1 lead. Lyon again responded just two minutes later in injury time with a goal from a Lyon youngster Anthony Mounier, thus evening the match heading into halftime. With Lyon constantly responding back, Lille effectively ended Lyon's chances of defending their title by scoring at the death with a goal from Nicolas Fauvergue giving Lyon no time to respond back, eliminating the defending champions from the Coupe de France.

Start formations

Starting 11
Note: Formation shown indicates formation used in  club's league match against Toulouse on May 30.

Squad stats

Appearances and goals
Last updated on May 30, 2009.

|-
|colspan="14"|Players sold/retired after the start of the season:

Other statistics
Last updated May 30, 2009

Note: For all competitive competitions

Reserves and Academy

The Olympique Lyonnais Reserves and Academy teams will also participate in seasonal activities this season. The second team, Olympique Lyonnais B, will participate in the Championnat de France Amateurs. The under-18 squad will participate in their league, the Championnat National Under-18 and the Coupe Gambardella. The under-16 squad will also participate in their league, Championnat National Under-16, as well as the Coupe Nationale des 16 ans, which is a regional tournament composed of regional squads that play against other regions. Lyon players selected will participate with the Rhône-Alpes team.

Match results
Note: For the squads of the CFA, Under-18, and the Under-16, click here and here.

Championnat de France Amateurs

Final stage

Championnat National Under-18

Final stage

Coupe Gambardella

Championnat National Under-16

2nd stage

Olympique Lyonnais Ladies

The Olympique Lyonnais Ladies will also participate in their respective activities this season. The ladies, just like their male counterparts, won the double last season. They will compete in the top tier French women's division, the Division 1 Féminine, the women's version of the Coupe de France, the Challenge de France, and the UEFA Women's Cup, where they will begin from the second qualifying round.

Note: For the Olympique Lyonnais women's squad, click here.

Match results

Division 1 Féminine

Challenge de France

Group B3

Second Qualifying Round

Quarter-finals

Semi-finals

References

Lyon
2008-09